Cem Islamoglu (born September 4, 1980) is a German footballer who plays for SV Waldhof Mannheim.

External links

1980 births
Living people
German footballers
German people of Turkish descent
SV Darmstadt 98 players
SV Waldhof Mannheim players
Sportfreunde Siegen players
SV Elversberg players
3. Liga players
Association football central defenders
People from Lahn-Dill-Kreis
Sportspeople from Giessen (region)
Footballers from Hesse